Billet (wood) was a specific and standardised form of wood fuel of significant importance in the traditional pre-fossil fuel economy. 
The term could also be applied to a cudgel.

Nature and use
Billets were especially designed for burning on open hearth fires, often in conjunction with spits.

Measurements and cost
The 16th C standardised a billet as three foot four inches in length, and ten inches around.

A century later, Anthony A Wood recorded a load of billet wood as costing 12s 6d; while extravagance consisted of "burning in one yeare threescore pounds worth of the choicest billet".

Literary references
The William Shakespeare play Measure for Measure contains the phrase "beat out my brains with billets".

See also
Bavin (wood)

Fascine

References

External links 
Definition of billet

Firewood

Fuels

Wood fuel